Lucia Aniello (born 1983) is an Italian-born American director, writer, and producer best known for her work on Hacks, for which she won multiple Emmy Awards, and Broad City. She has directed and written episodes of both shows, as well as the miniseries Time Traveling Bong and the 2017 film Rough Night.

Early life 
Aniello was born in Italy and grew up in Hadley, Massachusetts, where her parents owned Italian restaurants, before moving to New York City. In 2004, she graduated from Columbia University, where she was a film and media studies major and studied with film critic Andrew Sarris. She was in Sigma Delta Tau sorority. She also played varsity tennis for Columbia.

Career 
Aniello is an alumna of the Upright Citizens Brigade, an improvisational and sketch comedy group founded in 1990 by a group of comedians including Amy Poehler who is an executive producer of Broad City.

Aniello and Paul W. Downs met at a Upright Citizens Brigade Level One improvisational comedy class. Aniello and Downs began working together on a series of digital shorts and improv. They started their own website and comedy production company called Paulilu Productions. Together they have been writing, directing and acting in digital shorts since 2007. Some of their most well-known web series include The Diary of Zac Efron and The Real Housewives of South Boston. She also co-wrote and directed the first commercial for "Dollar Shave Club".

Work on Broad City 
Aniello also met Ilana Glazer of Broad City through the same Upright Citizens Brigade class where she met Downs. Aniello and Glazer were dressed nearly identically at the time of their first meeting, which they now think was a sign for their future work together. As Aniello and Downs began to make digital shorts and build the foundations of Paulilu, Glazer and Abbi Jacobson worked on the prototype of Broad City. The two comedic duos supported each other's work, occasionally acting in each other's shorts or directing them.

When Broad City moved to television Glazer and Jacobson asked Aniello to direct the pilot and cast Downs as Trey, the trainer and boss of Jacobson's character on the show. After the pilot did well and the show was picked up by Comedy Central, they asked both Aniello and Downs to join the group of writers for the show. While collectively, the group was relatively inexperienced and self-taught, they shared a passion for a feminist perspective on comedy and attribute their success to their collective vision. Broad City is widely known for its social commentary. The show is groundbreaking in how it breaks gender roles, positively portrays female sexuality and polyamory in hookup culture.

Current work 
Aniello also co-created Time Traveling Bong. Her interest in the subject began in college when she wrote a thesis on time-travel movies at Columbia University. The movie is a stoner film comedy about two cousins who acquire a bong that acts as a time traveling device. While the comedy is rather goofy, there is also a lot of underlying social commentary about how tough it was to be a minority throughout American history.

Aniello directed and, with Downs, co-wrote the comedy Rough Night, which was released in June 2017. It stars Scarlett Johansson, Zoe Kravitz, Kate McKinnon, Jillian Bell, Ilana Glazer, Demi Moore, Ty Burrell and Colton Haynes. During the time of the film's release, Aniello was the first woman to direct an R-rated comedy in nearly 20 years.

In 2020, she directed and executive produced the Comedy Central series Awkwafina Is Nora from Queens as well as Netflix's Baby-Sitters Club.

She is currently co-showrunning and directing HBO Max’s Hacks. More recently, Aniello and Paul W. Downs signed a deal with Warner Bros. Television.

Recognition 
Aniello has received recognition for her work, including “Best of NY Sketch,” in the 2010 New York Comedy Festival and a TONY's “Critic’s Pick.” Her work has been featured in the 2011 Just for Laughs Comedy Festival in Montreal.

Personal life 
Aniello resides in Los Angeles with her husband and comedic partner Paul W. Downs, with whom she co-wrote Rough Night. They have a son, born in 2022.

Awards and nominations

References

External links 
 

Columbia Lions women's tennis players
American women screenwriters
American women film producers
Film producers from Massachusetts
Television producers from Massachusetts
American women television producers
Living people
American women film directors
American television writers
American television directors
American women television directors
Film directors from Massachusetts
People from Hadley, Massachusetts
Italian emigrants to the United States
Screenwriters from Massachusetts
American women television writers
1983 births
Showrunners
21st-century American women
American people of Italian descent